Lancaster County Courthouse is a historic courthouse building located at Lancaster, Lancaster County, Pennsylvania. The original building was built between 1852 and 1855. The original building was designed by Philadelphia architect Samuel Sloan  (1815–1884). The north wing was added between 1896 and 1898, and low flanking wings on either side of the exterior staircase were added in 1926–1927. These later additions were designed by Lancaster architects James H. Warner and C. Emlen Urban, respectively. It is an important example of the Romanesque Revival style.

It was added to the National Register of Historic Places in 1978.  It is a contributing property to the Lancaster Historic District.

See also
 List of state and county courthouses in Pennsylvania

References

County courthouses in Pennsylvania
Courthouses on the National Register of Historic Places in Pennsylvania
Romanesque Revival architecture in Pennsylvania
Government buildings completed in 1927
Buildings and structures in Lancaster, Pennsylvania
Historic district contributing properties in Pennsylvania
National Register of Historic Places in Lancaster, Pennsylvania